Mike Dingle (born January 30, 1969) is a former American football running back. He played for the Cincinnati Bengals in 1991 and for the San Antonio Texans and Memphis Mad Dogs in 1995.

References

1969 births
Living people
American football running backs
South Carolina Gamecocks football players
Cincinnati Bengals players
San Antonio Texans players
Memphis Mad Dogs players